Darron Gary Stiles (born June 1, 1973) is an American professional golfer.

Stiles was born in St. Petersburg, Florida. He was a three-time All-America at Florida Southern College and was a member of the 1995 NCAA Division II National Championship team.

Stiles played on the Nationwide Tour in 1997, 1999–2002, 2004, and 2008 and the PGA Tour in 2003, 2005–07, and 2009. He gained his PGA Tour card for 2007 by finishing tied for 16th at Q-School in 2006 but failed to retain his card, and returned to the Nationwide Tour in 2008. He finished 7th on the Nationwide Tour money list in 2008 and earned his 2009 PGA Tour card. Stiles is the all-time career money leader through his 2012 win at the News Sentinel Open on the Web.com Tour with $1,815,688.

Stiles had successful surgery to remove a cancerous tumor from his jaw in 1989.

Professional wins (6)

PGA Tour of Australasia wins (1)

*Note: The 2008 HSBC New Zealand PGA Championship was shortened to 36 holes due to rain. Due to the event's length, this win is not officially recognized as a Nationwide Tour victory.
1Co-sanctioned by the Nationwide Tour

Web.com Tour wins (5)

Web.com Tour playoff record (1–0)

Results in major championships

CUT = missed the half-way cut
"T" = tied
Note: Stiles only played in the U.S. Open.

See also
2002 Buy.com Tour graduates
2004 Nationwide Tour graduates
2006 PGA Tour Qualifying School graduates
2008 Nationwide Tour graduates
2012 Web.com Tour graduates
2015 Web.com Tour Finals graduates
List of golfers with most Web.com Tour wins

External links

American male golfers
Florida Southern Moccasins men's golfers
PGA Tour golfers
Korn Ferry Tour graduates
Golfers from Florida
Golfers from North Carolina
Sportspeople from St. Petersburg, Florida
People from Pinehurst, North Carolina
1973 births
Living people